Magtar Lahjar is a department of Brakna Region in Mauritania.

List of municipalities in the department 
The Magtar Lahjar department is made up of following municipalities:

 Djonaba
 Magta-Lahjar
 Ouad Emour
 Sangrave.

In 2000, the entire population of the Magtar Lahjar Department has a total of 47 288 inhabitants  (22 338  men and 24 950 women).

References 

Departments of Mauritania